A stallion is an adult male, ungelded horse.

Stallion may also refer to:

In the military
 ADI Stallion, an American home-built utility aircraft
 Helio Stallion, an American STOL utility aircraft
 SS-N-16 Stallion, a Soviet anti-ship missile
 , two US Navy tugs
 Ashok Leyland Stallion, a range of trucks produced for the Indian Army

In business
 Stallion Group, a Nigerian multinational conglomerate
 Stallion Bus and Transit Corp., an American bus manufacturer and distributor
 Stallion, South African name for the Toyota Kijang series of pickup trucks and minivans 
 Stallion, code name for the HTC Inspire 4G smartphone

Arts and entertainment
 Stallion (band), an American pop rock group
 The Stallion, a series of five songs appearing on the 2003 Ween album All Request Live and originally recorded across the albums The Pod, Pure Guava, Chocolate and Cheese and Craters of the Sac
 Stallion (Gobots), a figure in the Gobots toyline
 Stallion (Suikoden), a character in the Suikoden series of role-playing video games
 Stallion, an American gay-themed adult magazine
Megan Thee Stallion, an American rapper

Sports teams

United States
 Baltimore Stallions, a former Canadian Football League franchise based in Baltimore, Maryland
 Birmingham Stallions (1983-1986), a former United States Football League franchise based in Birmingham, Alabama
 Boise Stallions (1999-2001), a former Indoor Professional Football League based in Boise, Idaho
 Buffalo Stallions (1979-1984), a former Major Indoor Soccer League team
 Dallas Stallions (1999), a former American professional roller hockey team based in Dallas, Texas
 Houston Stallions (2010-2012), a former indoor football team based in Houston, Texas
 Las Vegas Stallions, a former National Premier Soccer League team based in Las Vegas, Nevada, established in 2013
 New Jersey Stallions (1996-2004), a former team in the United Soccer Leagues, originally the New York/New Jersey Stallions
 Oklahoma Stallions, an American Basketball Association team based in Oklahoma City, Oklahoma
 Springfield Stallions (2006-2007), a former Continental Indoor Football League team based in Springfield, Illinois
 St. Louis Stallions, a proposed National Football League team to be located in St. Louis, Missouri

Elsewhere

 Marconi Stallions FC, an Australian association football club
 Brampton Stallions (2001-2006), a former Canadian Soccer League team
 Saskatoon Stallions, a Canadian minor league baseball team
 Doncaster Stallions (1969-1970), a defunct English motorcycle speedway team
 Northallerton Stallions, original name of the Catterick Crusaders, a rugby league team based in  Catterick, North Yorkshire, England; also known as the North Yorkshire Stallions in 2011
 Coastal Stallions, a former Fijian rugby union team
 Waicoa Bay Stallions, a New Zealand rugby league team
 Sialkot Stallions, a cricket team based in Sialkot, Punjab, Pakistan
 CDU Stallions, the sports teams of the Cebu Doctors' University in Mandaue, Philippines
 Stallion Laguna F.C., a Filipino association football club

See also
 Sikorsky CH-53 Sea Stallion, an American helicopter
 Sikorsky CH-53E Super Stallion, an American helicopter
 Sikorsky CH-53K Super Stallion, an American helicopter
 The Italian Stallion (disambiguation)
 The Young Stallions, former American professional wrestling tag-team